Charles Marin Eugster  (26 July 1919 – 26 April 2017) was a British-Swiss dentist and track and field and sprint athlete who competed as a masters athlete. After spending a career as a dentist, he moved to Uitikon, Switzerland, on his pension. At age 85, he began a fitness program. "I looked in the mirror one morning, and I didn't like what I saw."

Eugster was born in London in 1919 to Swiss parents. He won more than 100 fitness awards in multiple sports, including bodybuilding and rowing. He won multiple medals at the World Masters Regatta.

He was invited to do a talk at TEDx in Zürich in 2012 and gave a talk titled "Why bodybuilding at age 93 is a great idea".

Eugster died on 26 April 2017 of complications following heart failure at the age of 97.

References

External links 
 
 "Why bodybuilding at age 93 is a great idea", by Charles Eugster

1919 births
2017 deaths
British masters athletes
English dentists
English male long jumpers
English male rowers
English male sprinters
British emigrants to Switzerland
Fellows of the Royal Society of Medicine
People educated at St Paul's School, London
People in health professions from London
Athletes from London
Sportspeople from Zürich
Swiss dentists
Swiss male long jumpers
Swiss male rowers
Swiss male sprinters
Swiss masters athletes
Swiss military personnel
University of Zurich alumni
20th-century dentists